Shang Fa Yang (November 10, 1932 – February 12, 2007) was a Taiwanese-American plant scientist and a professor at the University of California, Davis. He was awarded the Wolf Prize in Agriculture and elected a member of the US National Academy of Sciences.

Early life and education 
Yang was born in 1932 in Taiwan. He earned his bachelor's and master's degrees in agricultural chemistry at the National Taiwan University. He subsequently moved to the United States and completed his doctoral degree in plant biochemistry from Utah State University.

Career 
After completing his PhD, he conducted postdoctoral research at the University of California, Davis, New York Medical School, and University of California, San Diego. He joined the faculty University of California, Davis in 1966.

Yang was known for his research that unlocked the key to prolonging freshness in fruits and flowers. His research focused on how plants produce ethylene, which is important in regulating a host of plant functions, ranging from seed germination to fruit ripening. He studied the pathway of ethylene biosynthesis and proved unequivocally the central role of methionine as a precursor of ethylene. He discovers that this process is cyclic and therefore receives the name "Yang Cycle". Ethylene represents one of the five major hormones affecting plant development and maturation.

He was the first scientist to report S-adenosylmethionine as an intermediate in methionine conversion to ethylene. Then, in 1979, he discovered aminocyclopropane-1-carboxylic acid (ACC) as an intermediate. His discovery of ACC-synthase opened the way to the understanding of the regulating process of ethylene biosynthesis.

Yang died on February 12, 2007, in a Davis hospital from complications of pneumonia.

Awards and honours 
Yang received several awards and honours for his research. In 1990, he was inducted into the U.S. National Academy of Sciences. In 1991, he was awarded the Wolf Prize in Agriculture "for his remarkable contributions to the understanding of the mechanism of biosynthesis, mode of action and applications of the plant hormone, Ethylene." In 1992, he was awarded the American Society of Horticultural Science Outstanding Research Award. Yang has been recognized as a Pioneer Member of the American Society of Plant Biologists.

Notes

References 
 IN MEMORIAM - Shang Fa Yang
 Plant Scientist Shang Fa Yang Dies

External links 

 Kent J. Bradford, "Shang Fa Yang", Biographical Memoirs of the National Academy of Sciences (2008)

1932 births
2007 deaths
Taiwanese emigrants to the United States
National Taiwan University alumni
University of California, Davis faculty
Utah State University alumni
Members of Academia Sinica
Wolf Prize in Agriculture laureates
Members of the United States National Academy of Sciences
Taiwanese biologists
American biologists
Scientists from Tainan
20th-century biologists